Reverend Cecil Arthur Boden (18 December 1890 – 31 May 1981) was an English cricketer. Boden was a right-handed batsman who bowled right-arm medium pace. He was born at Countesthorpe, Leicestershire and was educated at Christ's Hospital.

Boden made his first-class debut for Leicestershire against Nottinghamshire in the 1911 County Championship at Aylestone Road, Leicester, with him making six further first-class appearances for the county in that season. He made three first-class appearances in 1912, before making a final first-class appearance in the 1913 County Championship against Yorkshire. Boden made a total of eleven first-class appearances, scoring 196 runs at an average of 10.31, with a high score of 40.

He died at Hampstead Marshall, Berkshire on 31 May 1981.

References

External links
Cecil Boden at ESPNcricinfo
Cecil Boden at CricketArchive

1890 births
1981 deaths
People from Countesthorpe
Cricketers from Leicestershire
People educated at Christ's Hospital
English cricketers
Leicestershire cricketers